"Breaking Free" is a song from the Disney Channel Original Movie High School Musical. It also appears on the soundtrack of the same name. It is sung by Drew Seeley, Zac Efron, and Vanessa Hudgens. It was also released as a single on June 8, 2006. On June 21, 2006, it was certified as a Gold single by the RIAA for sales of over 500,000.

The song subsequently appeared on Vanessa Hudgens' compilation album, A Musical Tribute and appears on the Disney compilation album, Disney Channel Playlist, which was released on June 9, 2009.

Context
While Troy Bolton and Gabriella Montez face prejudice from the basketball and scholastic teams, respectively, they both decide that they can pursue their secret dream of performing in a high school musical. The song is sung during the film's climax when Troy and Gabriella participate in the callbacks in front of the entire student body. In-universe, the duet is written and composed by Kelsi Nielsen for the second act of the Twinkle Towne school musical.

Composition
The song, performed at the film's climax, is a "chirpy slow-jam". It's in the key of C minor in the beginning and in D minor at the end of the song.

Commercial performance
In its second week on the Billboard Hot 100, the single jumped from number 86 to number 4, the largest jump in the chart's history up to that point. "Breaking Free" was also the top-selling song of the week, reaching number one on the Digital Songs chart. The single went platinum.

Music video
The music video for this song was a clip from the movie and musical High School Musical. It was not released to any video countdowns in the US, because it was the climax song of the movie and Disney did not want it to be released. In Germany, a music video was created for a remix of the song using behind-the-scenes footage, which was later included on the High School Musical Remix Edition DVD.

Cover versions

British pop-duo Same Difference who came third on series 4 of The X Factor were due to release a cover version of "Breaking Free" on April 21, 2008. However, this was later canceled as the pair started working with Stock Aitken Waterman and recorded a 21st-century version of the Kylie Minogue Japanese hit "Turn It Into Love". The duo did, however, include a studio version of the song on their debut album, Pop.

Kayla Oldenburg also has plans to do a cover version of the song. The song is purported to be recorded in a live outtake from her impending marriage and will be released on a "pay as you see fit" model online. A physical release of the track is planned on 8-track as well.

American rock group The Faded covered a version of "Breaking Free" for the High School Musical Goes Punk compilation on Skunk-Ape Records. The video for the single is available on YouTube. "The original song is beautiful and sweet – there's absolutely nothing wrong with it," says vocalist, Gene Blalock, "but I think the message of the song – being yourself and breaking free from others' expectations and demands – gets lost on a wider audience who only hear this pretty duet. Reworking the song makes the message more accessible." The Faded's version replaces the duet, with Blalock doing the primary vocals, and members Micheal Diamond and Freddy Maciel offering backing harmony.

The rock band Porter Block also recorded a cover for the Ending Room Recordings cover compilation Guilt by Association Vol. 1.

It was also covered by English teenager Skyla in June 2009.

Joshua Bassett and Olivia Rodrigo performed a cover for the season one finale of High School Musical: The Musical: The Series. The song was also on the show's soundtrack.

Track listings
US and UK single
"Breaking Free"
"Start of Something New"

Italian single
"Breaking Free"

"Start of Something New"
"Se Provi a Volare" (Performed by Luca Dirisio)

Mexican single
"Eres Tú" (Performed by Belanova)

Portuguese single
"Breaking Free"
"O Que Eu Procurava" (Performed by Ludov)
"Só Tem Que Tentar"

French single
"Breaking Free"

European single
"Breaking Free"
"Breaking Free" (Instrumental)
"Breaking Free" (Remix)

Asian single
"Breaking Free" (Performed by Vince Chong, Nikki Gil, and Alicia Pan)

Chinese single
"Breaking Free (Mandarin Version)"

Charts

Weekly charts

Year-end charts

Certifications

References

2006 debut singles
Vanessa Hudgens songs
Zac Efron songs
2006 songs
Pop ballads
Songs from High School Musical (franchise)
Walt Disney Records singles
Songs written by Jamie Houston (songwriter)
Songs written for films
2000s ballads
Male–female vocal duets